Eogeophilus ("dawn earth lover") is an extinct genus of geophilid centipede that was discovered in the Nusplingen Limestone of Germany.<ref name="schweigertdietl1997"/ It is a monotypic genus, with only type species Eogeophilus jurassicus known.<ref name="fossilworks"/

Etymology 
The genus was named for its close relationship and similarities to the extant Geophilus. The specific epithet is derived from the Jurassic, which is in turn named after the Jura Mountain Range.

References 

Geophilomorpha
Kimmeridgian life
Jurassic animals of Europe
Jurassic Germany
Fossils of Germany
Fossil taxa described in 1997